"You Don't Have to Be a Star (To Be in My Show)" is a song written by James Dean and John Glover‎ and popularized by the husband/wife duo of Marilyn McCoo and Billy Davis Jr., former members of the vocal group The 5th Dimension. Released from their album, I Hope We Get to Love in Time, it became a crossover success, spending six months on the charts and soaring to No. 1 on both the Billboard Hot 100 and Hot Soul Singles charts during late 1976 and early 1977. It also reached No. 6 on Billboard's Easy Listening chart and No. 7 on the UK Singles Chart. It would eventually be certified gold, selling over one million copies, and winning the couple a Grammy Award for Best R&B Performance by a Duo or Group with Vocals in 1977.

Personnel
Marilyn McCoo - vocals
Billy Davis Jr. - vocals
James Jamerson - bass
Horrace Ott - concertmaster

Chart performance

Weekly charts

Year-end charts

All-time charts

Other versions

Geri Reischl and Barry Williams performed the song in a 1977 episode of The Brady Bunch Variety Hour.
In 1978, Ralph Carter and Janet Jackson performed it in the Season 5 finale of the CBS sitcom Good Times. At the time, Carter and Jackson were 16 and 11 years old, respectively.

References

External links
 Lyrics of this song
 

1976 singles
1976 songs
Male–female vocal duets
Songs about entertainers
Songs about the media
Billboard Hot 100 number-one singles
Cashbox number-one singles
RPM Top Singles number-one singles
ABC Records singles
Marilyn McCoo songs
Songs written by James Dean (songwriter)
Song recordings produced by Don Davis (record producer)